John Blair was a Scottish professional footballer who played as a centre-half.

References

Footballers from Glasgow
Scottish footballers
Association football defenders
Grimsby Town F.C. players
Stalybridge Rovers F.C. players
Sheffield United F.C. players
Gravesend United F.C. players
Gillingham F.C. players
English Football League players
Year of birth missing
19th-century births